, also known as ST Kingz, is a Japanese dance and performance troupe who have also choreographed dances for multiple Japanese and South Korean artists.

Career

Shit Kingz first performed together in October 2007, as Daichi Miura's back-up dancers. The group name originated from the word , which the members had intended as a hyperbole of having their audience "pee themselves" from the shock of seeing their performance; however, as the word is considered profanity in Japanese, they opted to use a word from a different language that would express a similar meaning. In 2010, several members performed as back-up dancers in BoA's Christmas concert. From 2010 to 2011, they were winners of the American dance contest, Body Rock, for two years in a row. Over the course of their career, they have choreographed for Japanese and South Korean artists including AAA, Winds, Daichi Miura, various groups from Johnny & Associates, TVXQ, Shinee, and Exo.

In 2016, Shit Kingz performed in their self-produced stage play Wonderful Clunker, to which Daichi Miura performed on the soundtrack. In 2018, they performed their stage play, The Library, with 30 shows in seven locations. They released their first album of the same name independently on December 7, 2018, with music produced by them. In 2019, they choreographed the dance in the ending sequence of the anime Business Fish.

Filmography

Television

Theatre

Anime

Choreography credits

Discography

Albums

References

External links
 

Amuse Inc. talents
Japanese dance groups
Japanese choreographers
Japanese performance artists